The Diocese of Moosonee is a diocese of the Ecclesiastical Province of Ontario of the Anglican Church of Canada. It was created in 1872 from part of the Diocese of Rupert's Land, in what is now the Province of Rupert's Land, and transferred in 1912 to the new Province of Ontario.  Now headquartered in Timmins, Ontario, it was originally headquartered in Moose Factory. Its first bishop was John Horden.

Following the retirement of the 8th bishop of Moosonee, Caleb Lawrence, in January 2010, an election synod was held on April 10, 2010, under the chairmanship of the then metropolitan of Ontario, Colin Johnson. The synod elected Tom Corston to be the 9th bishop of Moosonee; he was consecrated as a bishop and installed as Bishop of Moosonee on July 6, 2010. He served in that position until he retired on December 31, 2013, and thereafter acted as assisting bishop.

At that point, the diocese was reorganized as a mission area of the Province of Ontario, with the metropolitan of Ontario serving ex officio (i.e. automatically) as diocesan Bishop of Moosonee. On October 10, 2018, Anne Germond became the metropolitan of Ontario and now serves as Bishop of Moosonee, in addition to her jurisdiction in the Diocese of Algoma.

Bishops of Moosonee

Deans of Moosonee
The dean of Moosonee is also the rector of St. Matthew's Cathedral in Timmins:

1948–1954: Cuthbert Cooper Robinson (Bishop of Moosonee, 1955)
1955–1957: James Watton (Bishop of Moosonee, 1963)
1957–1961: S. J. Bell
c.1974: G. Coster Scovil
c.1977: John Fowler
?–?: Jerry Smith (for 5 years)
2007–?: Sharon Murdoch
2011–present: Gregory Gilson

References

External links

Diocese of Moosonee website

Moosonee, Anglican Diocese of
Anglican Church in Ontario
1874 establishments in Ontario
Organizations based in Ontario
Timmins
Anglican Province of Ontario